Krishna Avanti Primary School may refer to:

Krishna Avanti Primary School, Harrow, in north London, England
Krishna Avanti Primary School, Leicester, in East Midlands, England